The Speaker-class frigate was a type of English ship built early in the First Dutch War of 1652. The English government of the day, after it recognised the usefulness of large ships, ordered 30 frigates to be built. An early example of a large frigate, Speaker, launched in April 1650, provided the prototype for the class. 

Launched between 1650 and 1654, Speaker-class warships were about 750 tons and carried between 48 and 56 cannon. Their introduction caused the Dutch navy, which was still reliant on the use of armed merchant ships, to become obsolete. Speaker-class ships had much in common with the old Great Ships planned in 1618, being of a similar size, with two decks and a large number of guns. The class set the pattern for all the two-deck ships built up to the 19th century.

The third rate frigates in the Speaker-class built as part of the 1652 programme were Essex, Plymouth, Torrington, Newbury, Bridgewater, Lyme, Marston Moor, Langport, Fairfax,  Tredagh, and  ''Gloucester'.

References

Sources
 
 
 

Speaker-class ships of the line
1650s ships
History of the Royal Navy
Ships of the line of the Royal Navy